3 is the fourth (third with WEA Latina) studio album recorded by Spanish singer-songwriter Alejandro Sanz. It was released by WEA Latina on June 13, 1995 (see 1995 in music). This album reaffirmed the success obtained with his previous albums and made him popular in Europe and Latin America. The album was also recorded in Portuguese and Italian. All songs were written by Alejandro Sanz except "Quiero Morir en Tu Veneno". The official singles of the album were "La Fuerza del Corazón", "Mi Soledad y Yo", "¿Lo Ves?" and "Quiero Morir en Tu Veneno", and he shot a video for each single.

Track listing

Italian version

Portuguese version

Chart performance

Singles

Album certifications

Personnel

 Jack Adams – Mastering
 Miguel Angel Arenas – Producer
 Stefano Cantini – Saxophone
 Óscar Clavel – Engineer, mixing
 Paolo Costa – Electric bass
 Nigel Hitchcock – Saxophone
 D'Romy Ledo – Background vocals
 Pedro Miguel Ledo – Production assistant
 Juanjo Manez – Stylist "¿Lo Ves? (piano y voz)"
 Lele Melotti – Drums, percussion
 Phil Palmer – Acoustic guitar, electric guitar

 Elena Roggero – Background vocals
 Adolfo Rubio – Background vocals
 Emanuele Ruffinengo – Arranger, keyboards, programming, producer
 Miguel Sacristán – Piano "¿Lo Ves? (piano y voz)"
 Alejandro Sanz – Vocals, arranger, Spanish guitar
 Jesus Ugalde – Photography
 Ludovico Vagnone – Acoustic guitar, electric guitar
 R. Vigil – Design
 Juan Vinader – Engineer, mixing
 Mark Warner – Mixing assistant

Re-release
3 (Edición 2006) is the re-release of the album 3 containing a CD and DVD. The CD contains 14 tracks and the DVD contains 8 videos.

Track listing

CD

DVD
 La Fuerza del Corazón (Video)
 Mi Soledad y Yo (Video)
 ¿Lo Ves? (Video)
 Quiero Morir en Tu Veneno (Video)
 Veleno (Video)
 A Força do Coração (Video)
 Mi Trascini Via (Video)
 EPK

See also
List of best-selling albums in Spain

References

1995 albums
Alejandro Sanz albums
Warner Music Latina albums